Mountains of West Virginia is a list of mountains in the U.S. state of West Virginia. This list includes mountains in the Appalachian range, which covers the entirety of the state. West Virginia's official state nickname is the Mountain State.

References

Mountains

West Virginia
West Virginia